Jill Tracy Biden (born June 3, 1951) is an American educator and the current first lady of the United States since 2021, as the wife of President Joe Biden. She was the second lady of the United States from 2009 to 2017 when her husband was vice president. Since 2009, Biden has been a professor of English at Northern Virginia Community College, and is thought to be the first wife of a vice president or president to hold a paying job during her husband's tenure.

She has a bachelor's degree in English from the University of Delaware, master's degrees in education and English from West Chester University and Villanova University, and returned to the University of Delaware for a doctoral degree in education. She taught English and reading in high schools for thirteen years and instructed adolescents with emotional disabilities at a psychiatric hospital. Then for fifteen years, she was an English and writing instructor at Delaware Technical & Community College.

Born in Hammonton, New Jersey, she grew up in Willow Grove, Pennsylvania. She married Joe Biden in 1977, becoming the stepmother of Beau and Hunter, two sons from Joe Biden's first marriage. Biden and her husband also have a daughter together, Ashley Biden, born in 1981. She is the founder of the Biden Breast Health Initiative non-profit organization, co-founder of the Book Buddies program, co-founder of the Biden Foundation, is active in Delaware Boots on the Ground, and with Michelle Obama is co-founder of Joining Forces. She has published a memoir and two children's books.

Early life 
Jill Tracy Jacobs was born on June 3, 1951, in Hammonton, New Jersey. She is the oldest of five sisters. Her father, Donald Carl Jacobs, was a bank teller and U.S. Navy signalman during World War II who used the G.I. Bill to attend business school and then worked his way up in the banking field. Her mother, Bonny Jean (Godfrey) Jacobs, was a homemaker of English and Scottish descent.

As a child, she and her family lived in Hatboro, Pennsylvania, and relocated when she was eight to Mahwah, New Jersey. Her father was the CEO of the Mahwah Savings and Loan Association. In 1961 the Jacobs family moved to Willow Grove, Pennsylvania, a northern suburb of Philadelphia and Donald Jacobs became the president and CEO of InterCounty Savings and Loan in the Chestnut Hill neighborhood of Philadelphia, a position he held for twenty years.

Her parents labeled themselves as "agnostic realists" and did not attend church, but she often attended Sunday services at a Presbyterian church with her grandmother. Later, Jacobs independently took membership classes at nearby Abington Presbyterian Church and at age 16, was confirmed. 

Jill Jacobs always intended to have a career. She began working at age 15, which included waitressing in Ocean City, New Jersey. She attended Upper Moreland High School, where by her own later description, she was somewhat rebellious and enjoyed her social life and being a prankster. However she has recalled that she always had loved being in English class, and her classmates have said she was a good student. She graduated in 1969.

Education and career, marriages and family 

Jacobs enrolled in Brandywine Junior College in Pennsylvania for one semester. She intended to study fashion merchandising but found it unsatisfying. She married Bill Stevenson, a former college football player, in February 1970 taking the name Jill Stevenson. Within a couple of years he opened the Stone Balloon in Newark, Delaware, near the University of Delaware. It became one of the most successful college bars in the nation.

She switched her enrollment to the University of Delaware becoming a student in its College of Arts and Sciences, declaring English as her major. She took a year off from college and did a little modeling for a local agency in Wilmington to supplement her income. She and Stevenson drifted apart and they separated in 1974.

She met Senator Joe Biden in March 1975. They met on a blind date set up by Joe's brother Frank, who had known her in college, though Biden had seen her photograph in a local advertisement. Although he was nearly nine years her senior, she was impressed by his more formal appearance and manners compared to the college men she had known, and after their first date, she told her mother, "Mom, I finally met a gentleman." Meanwhile, she was going through turbulent divorce proceedings with Stevenson; the court case ended with her not getting the half-share in the Stone Balloon she had wanted. A civil divorce was granted in May 1975.

She graduated with a Bachelor of Arts in English from the University of Delaware in 1975. She began her career as a substitute teacher for the Wilmington public school system, then taught high school English full-time for a year at St. Mark's High School in Wilmington. Around this time she spent five months working in Biden's Senate office; this included weekly trips with the senator's mobile outreach operation to the southern portions of the state.

She and Joe Biden were married on June 17, 1977, at the Chapel at the United Nations in New York City.  It was described afterward by Joseph R. Biden, Sr. as "a very private affair" that was officiated by a Jesuit priest; the nature of the ceremony in religious terms is unclear. 
This was four and a half years after his first wife, Neilia Hunter Biden, and infant daughter, Naomi Christina Biden, died in a motor vehicle accident; Joe had proposed several times before she accepted, as she was wary of entering the public spotlight, anxious to remain focused on her own career, and initially hesitant to take on the commitment of raising his two young sons who had survived the accident. They spent their honeymoon at Lake Balaton in the Hungarian People's Republic, behind the Iron Curtain. She raised Beau and Hunter, and they called her Mom, but she did not formally adopt them.

She continued to teach while working on a master's degree at West Chester State College, taking one course per semester. She graduated with a Master of Education degree, with a specialty in reading from West Chester in 1981. The Bidens' daughter Ashley Blazer was born on June 8, 1981, and Jill stopped working for two years while raising the three children.

She then returned to work, teaching English, acting as a reading specialist, and teaching history to emotionally disabled students. She taught in the adolescent program at the Rockford Center psychiatric hospital for five years in the 1980s. Biden received her second graduate degree, a Master of Arts in English from Villanova University, in 1987. During her husband's unsuccessful bid for the 1988 Democratic presidential nomination, she said she would continue her job of teaching emotionally disabled children even if she became the first lady. She taught for three years at Claymont High School. In the early 1990s, she taught English at Brandywine High School in Wilmington; several of her students there later recalled her as genuinely caring about them. In all, she spent thirteen years teaching in public high school.

From 1993 through 2008, Biden was an Instructor in English at the Stanton campus of Delaware Technical & Community College. There she taught English composition and remedial writing, with an emphasis on instilling confidence in students. She has said of teaching at a community college, "I feel like I can make a greater difference in their lives. I just love that population. It just feels really comfortable to me. I love the women who are coming back to school and getting their degrees, because they're so focused."

Biden is president of the Biden Breast Health Initiative, a nonprofit organization begun in 1993 that provides educational breast health awareness programs free of charge to schools and other groups in the state of Delaware. She began the effort after four of her friends were diagnosed with breast cancer that year. In the following 15 years, the organization informed more than 7,000 high school girls about proper breast health. In 2007, Biden helped found Book Buddies, which provides books for low-income children, and has been very active in Delaware Boots on the Ground, an organization that supports military families. She runs five miles, five times a week, and she has run in the Marine Corps Marathon as well as the Philadelphia Half Marathon.

Biden later returned to school for her doctoral degree, studying under her birth name, Jill Jacobs. In January 2007, at age 55, she received a Doctor of Education (Ed.D.) in educational leadership from the University of Delaware. Her dissertation, Student Retention at the Community College: Meeting Students' Needs, was published under the name Jill Jacobs-Biden.

Biden has regularly attended Mass with her husband at St. Joseph's on the Brandywine in Greenville, Delaware. Whether she has ever formally converted to Catholicism, or explicitly identifies as a Catholic, has not been made public.

Role in 2008 presidential campaign 

Despite personally opposing the Iraq War, Biden had not wanted her husband to run in the 2004 presidential election, to the point where she interrupted one strategy meeting discussing the possibility by entering in a swimsuit with the word "NO" inscribed on her stomach. But following George W. Bush's reelection in 2004, she urged her husband to run again for president, later saying: "I literally wore black for a week. I just could not believe that he won, because I felt that things were already so bad. I was so against the Iraq War. And I said to Joe, 'You've got to change this, you have to change this.'" During Joe Biden's unsuccessful campaign to be the 2008 Democratic presidential nominee, she continued to teach during the week and would join him for campaigning on weekends. She said she would have taken an activist role in addressing education as her chief focus of concern as a potential first lady. She also said she would not seek inclusion in Cabinet meetings and that "I say that I'm apolitical if that's at all possible being married to Joe for 30 years."

Once her husband was selected as the running mate to Democratic presidential nominee Barack Obama, she began campaigning again. She wore a Blue Star Mothers Club pin in recognition of Beau Biden's deployment to Iraq. She was not a polished political speaker but was able to establish a connection with the audience. She also made some joint appearances with Michelle Obama. Throughout the time her husband was running for vice president, Jill Biden continued to teach four days a week at Delaware Technical & Community College during the fall 2008 semester and then campaigned over the long weekend while grading class papers on the campaign bus.

Second Lady of the United States (2009–2017)

First term 

Following the election of the Obama–Biden ticket, she and her husband moved into Number One Observatory Circle (in January 2009), the official vice presidential residence in Washington. But as the new second lady of the United States, Biden intended to keep teaching at a Washington-area community college, and several of them recruited her. In January 2009, she began teaching two English courses as an adjunct professor at the Alexandria campus of Northern Virginia Community College (NOVA), the second largest community college in the nation. It has been rare for second ladies to work while their spouses serve as vice president, and Biden is believed to have been the first second lady to hold a paying job while her husband was vice president. In White House announcements and by her preference, she was referred to as "Dr. Jill Biden".

Catherine Russell, a former adviser to the Senate Foreign Relations Committee, was named Biden's chief of staff for her role as second lady. Courtney O'Donnell, a former spokesperson for Howard Dean and Elizabeth Edwards, was named her communications director and Kirsten White, a lawyer at Morgan, Lewis & Bockius, her policy director. As Second Lady, Biden had a staff of eight overall and occupied a corner suite in the Eisenhower Executive Office Building.

In May 2009, Obama announced that Biden would be in charge of an initiative to raise awareness about the value of community colleges.
Biden continued teaching two English reading and writing classes at NOVA in fall 2009. In January 2010, she gave the commencement speech at the University of Delaware's winter commencement, the first such address by her at a major university. In August 2010, Biden appeared as herself in an episode of Lifetime's Army Wives, making it part of her campaign to raise awareness of military families.

In April 2011, she and Michelle Obama founded a national initiative, Joining Forces, to showcase the needs of U.S. military families. In September 2011, Biden lent her support to USAID's FWD campaign, a push for awareness surrounding the deadly famine, war, and drought affecting more than 13 million people in the Horn of Africa.

She continued to teach at NOVA, and by 2011 held a permanent position as an associate professor, teaching three English and writing composition courses two days per week. She made her position there as normal as she could, sharing a cubicle with another teacher, holding regular office hours for students, and trying to persuade her accompanying Secret Service agents to dress as unobtrusively as possible. Her students were often unaware of exactly who she was, referring to her simply as "Dr. B." She told a colleague, "My standard line when students ask me if I am married to the VP is to say that I am one of his relatives. That usually quiets them." She was known as a compassionate teacher who engaged with her students' lives, but also one who assigned a lot of homework and was a tough grader. Staffers recall Biden always carrying students' work around with her on trips, and Michelle Obama's recollection of her time traveling with Biden was simply, "Jill is always grading papers."

An examination by The New York Times of her e-mails while second lady concluded that, "she shared the perks of the White House with her teaching colleagues, arranging for tickets to White House events like a garden visit and a holiday tour. But she didn't appear to pull rank; when she needed to take time off workto attend an event with the Obamas or go on an overseas trip with her husbandshe requested permission from the college."
In February 2012, she staged a "Community College to Career" bus tour with Secretary of Labor Hilda Solis that aimed to showcase alliances between community colleges and local and regional businesses.

Her life with her husband at Number One Observatory Circle tended towards the informal and was centered around family and their nearby grandchildren. In June 2012, she published a children's book, Don't Forget, God Bless Our Troops, based around her stepson Beau's deployment. The same month, the Bidens' daughter Ashley, a social worker and former staffer at the Delaware Department of Services for Children, Youth, and Their Families, married Howard Krein.

Role in 2012 presidential campaign 
In the 2012 U.S. presidential election, in which her husband was running for re-election as vice president, Biden played a modest role. She did not cut back on her teaching schedule and made few solo campaign appearances. This reflected her continuing distaste both for politics and for public speaking, even though the Obama campaign considered her valuable in connecting to military families, teachers, and women.

Second term 

Following the re-election of Obama and her husband on November 6, 2012, Biden began a second term (January 2013) as second lady. She wore a silk blue gown by Vera Wang when she appeared at the inaugural balls in January 2013.

During her husband's second term, Biden continued to be involved with supporting military personnel, including staging multiple visits to the Center for the Intrepid rehabilitation facility for amputees and attending the inaugural Invictus Games in London. During the 2014 U.S. midterm Congressional elections, she campaigned for a number of Democrats, including some in high-profile contests such as Mark Udall in Colorado and Michelle Nunn in Georgia.

In May 2015, her stepson Beau Biden died from brain cancer. She later described the loss as "totally shattering. My life changed in an instant. All during his illness, I truly believed that he was going to live, up until the moment that he closed his eyes, and I just never gave up hope." She has said that she lost her faith following his death and stopped praying and attending church for four years, but later started to find faith again as a result of campaign trail interactions with people in 2019.

She was present at her husband's side in the Rose Garden on October 21, 2015, when he announced he would not run for the Democratic Party presidential nomination in the 2016 election. By her own account, Biden was disappointed by his decision, believing her husband was highly qualified for the position, and "would have been the best president".

Biden continued to teach at NOVA, handling a full load of five classes during the Fall 2015 semester. During 2016, she was present with her husband on a listening tour for Cancer Moonshot 2020, an effort he was leading. In March 2016, she headed the official party that welcomed American astronaut Scott Kelly back to Earth from his almost full year in space.

Subsequent activities 

The former second couple launched the Biden Foundation in February 2017, with the purpose of allowing them to pursue the causes they cared most about, including focuses upon preventing violence against women, his moonshot initiative, and her interests in community colleges and military families. That same month, she was named board chair of Save the Children; she said, "I think [their] emphasis on education fits with my life's work." Her husband was seen as a popular ex-vice president, and she received a standing ovation when she was a presenter at the 71st Tony Awards.

In June 2017, the couple bought a $2.7million, off-the-water vacation home in Rehoboth Beach, Delaware, near Cape Henlopen State Park, where they planned to host members of their extended family. Their ability to purchase this family property was due in part to deals they signed with Flatiron Books upon leaving office, with Biden contracted to write one book and her husband two. By 2019, the couple reported some $15million in income since leaving the vice presidency, including $700,000 in speaking engagements for herself. The couple also substantially increased their charitable giving during this period.

Jill Biden continued to teach full-time at NOVA after her husband left office, with a salary of close to $100,000. She was selected to give the keynote address at a commencement for Milwaukee Area Technical College in May 2017. She gave the keynote address at a California teachers summit in July 2017, emphasizing the importance of communities supporting their teachers given the emotional and circumstantial stresses they often have to function under. Then in May 2018, she gave a commencement address at Bishop State Community College in Alabama, telling the graduates that "Maybe like me, life got in the way and it's taken you a lot longer than you expected to get here today.... Whoever you are, know this, if you can walk across this stage, you can do anything." In February 2019, she spoke to the graduating class of the Newport News Apprentice School, telling them she realized many of them were in complicated life situations with multiple responsibilities, and that "Sometimes your day is a jigsaw puzzle that never seems to get completed.... But no matter where life takes you, as of today you are a master of a craft, a shipbuilder and a leader, and no one can take that away from you."

In May 2019, her memoir Where the Light Enters: Building a Family, Discovering Myself was published. The book has little political content, instead focusing on aspects of family. In it she says that while she is "grateful" to have been Second Lady, "The role I have always felt most at home in is being 'Dr. B.'" USA Today called it an "often-poignant memoir that charts her journey from a rebellious teen to young divorcee to the second lady of the United States." Biden did some book signings to help promote the work.

Role in 2020 presidential campaign 

Regarding the much-discussed possibility of her husband running in the 2020 United States presidential election, Biden was a key participant in his decision-making process. By one report in March 2019, she was "enthusiastically" in favor of his running.

The Joe Biden 2020 presidential campaign was officially announced on April 25, 2019. A Town and Country magazine headline declared that "Jill Biden Might Just Be Joe Biden's Greatest Political Asset".

Days later, Biden addressed the matter of women who had accused her husband of physical contact that had made them feel uncomfortable by saying, "I think what you don't realize is how many people approach Joe. Men and women, looking for comfort or empathy. But going forward, I think he's gonna have to judgebe a better judgeof when people approach him, how he's going to react. That he maybe shouldn't approach them." She said she had experienced male intrusion on personal space herself: "I just sorta stepped aside. I didn't address it.... things have changed. There was a time when women were afraid to speak out. I can remember specifically it was in a job interview... if that same thing happened today, I'd turn around and say, 'What do you think you're doin'?'... it's totally different." She also attracted attention by saying "it's time to move on" concerning her husband's role in 1991 regarding Anita Hill and the Clarence Thomas Supreme Court nomination.

Biden continued to teach at NOVA during 2019, at one point telling a reporter, "I'm here grading research papers in between interviews." She staged appearances without her husband in early contest states such as Iowa, in some cases accompanied by a granddaughter. She attracted notice during one campaign stop in New Hampshire when she emphasized the electability argument in favor of her husband, saying, "you know, your candidate might be better on, I don't know, health care, than Joe is, but you've got to look at who's going to win this election, and maybe you have to swallow a little bit and say, 'OK, I personally like so-and-so better,' but your bottom line has to be that we have to beat Trump."

Once Hunter Biden became a Republican political focus during the Trump–Ukraine scandal, she was outspoken: "Hunter did nothing wrong. And that's the bottom line." The strain of the subsequent impeachment trial was enough to fracture a friendship she had with South Carolina senator Lindsey Graham, who repeatedly called for Hunter Biden to be questioned as a witness at the trial.

Biden played a more active role in this presidential campaign than she had in her husband's two prior ones, and for the first time, Biden reluctantly took a leave of absence from NOVA for the spring 2020 semester so she could be on the campaign trail full-time. She took training in online teaching once the COVID-19 pandemic in the United States struck. She indicated that she intended to resume teaching at NOVA even if her husband were to be elected.

In the weeks leading up to the Iowa caucuses, she sometimes staged more campaign appearances in that state than her husband did. She gave out her campaign e-mail address to voters in case they wanted to ask her follow-up questions. In joint appearances, she sometimes spoke after he did, acting in the "closer" role. After experiencing a number of victories around the nation, she gained some media attention at the March3 Super Tuesday primaries during her husband's speech when she physically blocked a protester from getting at him. Asked about the stiff-arm she employed, she said, "I'm a good Philly girl."

With her husband having become the presumptive Democratic nominee, in June 2020, she published the children's book Joey: The Story of Joe Biden, which portrayed him as having been "brave and adventurous" as a child despite having a stutter he was bullied for. In July 2020, she spoke out about the impact of the COVID-19 pandemic on education, appearing in a video with her husband to emphasize that she understands the frustration with virtual education substitutes: "Schools and parents alike want a clear, science-based strategy, not mixed messages and ultimatums." She criticized U.S. Secretary of Education Betsy DeVos for what she saw as political motivations in advocating a reopening of schools no matter what and said that "the first thing [Joe Biden]'s going to do is pick a secretary of education, who is a public school educator and has experience in the classroom. I mean I hear that, again and again and againno more Betsy DeVos."

She was heavily involved in the vice-presidential selection process that resulted in Senator Kamala Harris's being chosen. On the second night of the virtual 2020 Democratic National Convention, Biden spoke from the classroom at Brandywine High School, where she had once taught English. She drew parallels between family suffering and the plight of the country, saying, "How do you make a broken family whole? The same way you make a nation whole. With love and understanding and with small acts of kindness, with bravery, with unwavering faith." During the final stretch of the general election, she campaigned in the Delaware Valley region of Pennsylvania, near her home town, emphasizing the importance of the swing state and of women voting, saying, "You will decide, you, the women, will decide the future of this state and this state may determine the entire election."

First Lady of the United States (2021–present)

Role and continued teaching 

Biden's husband was elected president and took office on January 20, 2021. She is the first spouse since Barbara Bush to hold the positions of both Second Lady and First Lady and is the first one since Pat Nixon to hold them non-consecutively. At the age of 69, Biden was the oldest first lady to assume the role. She is also the first Italian American first lady. In mid-November 2020, it was announced that her chief of staff as first lady would be attorney and diplomat Julissa Reynoso Pantaleon and that her senior advisor in the role would be campaign staffer Anthony Bernal. In December 2020, an op-ed piece by writer Joseph Epstein in The Wall Street Journal, which urged the incoming First Lady to drop the "Dr." from her preferred form of address because she is not a medical doctor, was met with a widespread backlash, especially among professional women. Outgoing First Lady Melania Trump did not invite incoming First Lady Jill Biden to the White House for tea and a tour, which previously had been a tradition in the presidential transition of power.

She resumed teaching at NOVA, albeit at first on a remote basis over Zoom due to the pandemic. This has made her the first wife of a sitting U.S. president to hold a paying job outside the White House. For security reasons and for students who are looking to add a class taught by Biden, her classes at NOVA have often been listed as instructed by "staff". She has stayed up late in the White House quarters to review assignments she has given her students. In September 2021 she returned to in-person teaching at NOVA. Her presence there exemplified the Biden administration's desire to get students and teachers back to physical schools; she subsequently said "thank God we all got off Zoom".  Security for her classes became tighter than it had been as second lady, with students having to go through a metal detector and initially getting a security briefing.  She has maintained her reputation as a tough grader who gave a lot of homework. 

First ladies are expected to have one or more causes that they advocate for, and Biden's have been military families, education, and aspects of health care.  The same day may see her teaching classes at the college and then flying to an appearance as first lady.  Of managing her professional life, her family roles, and her first lady activities all together, Biden has said, "You can't do anything in a haphazard way. You have to have purpose while you're doing it, and it has to be organized. That's the key to it."

Domestic initiatives and activities 

The Joining Forces program with Michelle Obama, which was put on hiatus by Melania Trump, has been revived by Biden. During visits to Joint Base Lewis–McChord and Naval Air Station Whidbey Island in the state of Washington, Biden said that "the men and women of our armed forces can't be at their best when they are worried that their families are struggling," and praised the joint base for having dedicated spaces for service children on the autistic spectrum. During 2021, Biden visited 16 military installations and worked with Joining Forces to hold over 20 events for military families focusing on employment, entrepreneurship and other issues. In the same year, the Office of the First Lady joined the U.S. National Security Council in launching the Joining Forces Interagency Policy Committee to secure proposals across the federal government to support military families.

During her husband's first year in office, Biden was put in charge of the public push for legislation that, as part of the American Families Plan, would provide free tuition to students attending community colleges. This proposal, initially estimated at over $100 billion, became part of the large proposed Build Back Better Act (BBB). The BBB social spending initiatives went through a series of negotiations during the year and the bill as a whole struggled to find sufficient support among Democrats in the Senate. Biden continued to advocate for the free community college tuition item and some Democrats in Congress pushed for it too once it became known that it might be eliminated. In a February 2022 appearance before the Community College National Legislative Summit, Biden publicly acknowledged that the free community college tuition item had been dropped from any BBB bill and said that she was "disappointed ... these aren't just bills and budgets to me." (After many further negotiations, a significantly reduced bill passed Congress and became law as the Inflation Reduction Act of 2022, with free tuition for community college one of those provisions that did not make the cut.)

Jill Biden is an advocate for COVID-19 vaccination and toured the United States as a part of President Biden's campaign to vaccinate Americans against COVID-19.   Indeed, at times she was the foremost spokesperson in the administration for the vaccination effort; she was sent to parts of the country known for anti-vaccine beliefs and antipathy towards her husband, under the belief that she had a better chance of communicating with people in those areas.  Biden, who was fully vaccinated with two booster shots, contracted COVID-19 herself in August 2022 and went into isolation protocols; she subsequently encountered Rebound Covid as well. In January 2023, Biden underwent Mohs surgery to remove two basal-cell carcinoma lesions from her face and chest.

Jill Biden is also more political than previous first ladies. According to a President's advisor, she is "one of the top raisers across the board for us as a party." In October 2021, she visited Virginia to deliver a "last-minute stump" speeches for the Democratic governor, Terry McAuliffe, in his race against Republican challenger and his successor Glenn Youngkin. In 2022, she organized seven fundraisers for the Democratic National Committee. She described the 2022 overruling of the Roe v. Wade Supreme Court ruling as "unjust and so devastating." She criticized former president Donald Trump and Russian president Vladimir Putin during public events and private Democratic National Committee fundraisers. She also criticized Republican opposition of an assault weapons ban and more spending on climate change. In July 2022, Biden expressed frustration with the challenges her husband have faced as his administration has sought to address a range of issues.  She has played a role in the hiring of people within the administration's press personnel and has criticized them when she felt they were not sufficiently protecting her husband's image.

By October 2022, Biden had visited 40 U.S. states as first lady, outpacing the number of states that her husband visited during his presidency.

Foreign trips and activities 

In June 2021, Joe and Jill Biden visited Cornwall in the United Kingdom to attend the 47th G7 summit. Biden and the Duchess of Cambridge visited primary school students and participated in a roundtable discussion focusing on early childhood education. The pair penned an op-ed that was published by CNN about early childhood care. In July 2021, Biden visited Tokyo, Japan in her first solo trip abroad as the first lady. There, she met Japanese Prime Minister Yoshihide Suga with his wife Mariko Suga at Akasaka Palace and met Emperor Naruhito at Tokyo Imperial Palace. She also visited American athletes at the 2020 Summer Olympic Games and attended the Olympics opening ceremony at the Olympic Stadium. In October 2021, Joe and Jill Biden visited Vatican City. There, the couple met Pope Francis at the Apostolic Palace to discuss world poverty and climate change. In the same month, the couple visited Rome, Italy to attend G20 Leaders' Summit. Biden met Maria Cappello, wife of Italian Prime Minister Mario Draghi at Chigi Palace and Brigitte Macron, wife of French President Emmanuel Macron at Il Marchese restaurant. She also visited the families of American troops in Naples.

In May 2022, during the 2022 Russian invasion of Ukraine, Biden made a trip (without her husband) to Romania and Slovakia, visiting with Ukrainian women and children refugees and asking questions of workers from aid organizations. During this, she made an unannounced trip across the Slovakia–Ukraine border to Uzhhorod, Ukraine, where she met with displaced Ukrainian schoolchildren, as well as with Ukrainian first lady Olena Zelenska.  The visit coincided with Mother's Day as celebrated in the U.S., and Biden said, "I wanted to come on Mother's Day. We thought it was important to show the Ukrainian people that this war has to stop, and this war has been brutal, and that the people of the United States stand with the people of Ukraine." It was the first visit to a war zone by a U.S. first lady without her husband since Laura Bush went to Afghanistan in 2008, and it was the first appearance in public for Zelenska since the invasion started.  At a subsequent NATO summit, Biden and several other first ladies emphasized a commitment to helping Ukrainian refugees. 

Also in May 2022, Biden visited Ecuador, Panama, and Costa Rica.  At each stop, she engaged in public appearances and diplomatic discussions that emphasized the value that partnership with the United States brought in by addressing a variety of issues within those countries.

Approval ratings, popularity and controversy 
In October 2021, Biden was placed the seventh most popular first lady out of twelve recent first ladies from an online survey poll by Zogby Analytics.

During the first year and a half of being first lady, a CNN poll revealed that Biden's favorability ratings had declined, from 58 percent favorable to 28 percentage unfavorable at the time of her husband's inauguration, compared to 34 percent favorable to 29 percent unfavorable during June–July 2022.  A popularity dip of that extext was unusual, as first ladies usually have stronger ratings than their husbands do and stay high even when their husbands' ratings decline.  The decline has been attributed to Biden being more outwardly political than previous first ladies; to the general increase of partisan polarization in the United States dragging down everyone associated with an unpopular president; and, because of a large number of respondents shifting their views to "no opinion", an artifact of how the CNN poll was conducted. The poll also showed that Biden is still more popular among Republicans than both the president and vice president.

Biden has been noted for having superior message discipline compared to her husband and has rarely produced gaffes.  However, one did occur at the July 2022 conference of Latino advocacy organization UnidosUS, when Biden claimed Latino Americans were as "unique" as tacos. She also mispronounced the word "bodegas". Her Latino stereotyping caused widespread condemnation, including from the National Association of Hispanic Journalists, who issued a statement which said "We are not tacos." Biden apologized via a spokesman. The combination of a polling decline and the gaffe was noted as unfortunate timing for the White House and the Democratic Party, who were working to win back Hispanic voters who had drifted to the Republican Party, prior the 2022 midterm elections. In any case, Biden's use in such roles was not diminished, as she became the most requested surrogate of anyone in the Biden administration (including her husband) during fall 2022 campaigns and often was utilized in Republican-leaning areas.

Fashion and style 
In September 2020, Biden wore Stuart Weitzman's black boots with the word "vote" written on them. The boots she wore was sold out immediately and page views for the boots spiked five-fold the next day. At her husband's victory speech in Wilmington, Biden wore an Oscar de la Renta dark-blue floral dress designed by Fernando Garcia and Laura Kim. The dress she wore sold out quickly. In March 2021, her spokesperson stated that the first lady's press team would not comment on her clothes. During her public appearances, Biden has been noted to favor jeans and cashmere sweaters created by American designers with focus on sustainability. On February 13, 2021, Biden posted a photo on Twitter of her shopping for cupcakes in Washington, D.C. while wearing a scrunchie, which went viral. Of the attention the scrunchie photo got, Biden said on The Kelly Clarkson Show, "I still don't understand it."

In August 2021, she became the cover of Vogue magazine. She was photographed by Annie Leibovitz and wore an Oscar de la Renta floral dress with earrings by Tiffany & Co. Biden became the cover of Harper's Bazaar for June/July 2022 issue. She became the first First Lady to cover in the magazine's 155-year history.

Writings

Books 
Jacobs-Biden, Jill (2006). Student Retention at the Community College: Meeting Students' Needs (Newark, DE: University of Delaware, Fall 2006) [doctoral dissertation]
Biden, Jill (2012). Don't Forget, God Bless Our Troops (New York: Simon & Schuster) [children's, illustrations by Raúl Colón]

 [children's, illustrations by Amy June Bates]

Authored articles

Notes

References

Further reading 
 Julie Pace and Darlene Superville, Jill: A Biography of the First Lady (New York: Little, Brown and Company, 2022).

External links 

 Official White House page
 Obama White House biography (archived)
 Joining Forces
 Biden Breast Health Initiative 
 Biden Foundation
 Delaware Boots on the Ground
 
 Rate My Professors reactions

 
1951 births
21st-century American women writers
20th-century American educators
21st-century American educators
20th-century American women educators
21st-century American women educators
American memoirists
American people of English descent
American people of Scottish descent
American people of Italian descent
American women academics
Jill
Delaware Democrats
Living people
People from Hammonton, New Jersey
People from Mahwah, New Jersey
People from Montgomery County, Pennsylvania
People from Wilmington, Delaware
First ladies of the United States
Second ladies of the United States
Spouses of Delaware politicians
University of Delaware alumni
Villanova University alumni
West Chester University alumni